Berthold Karl Hölldobler BVO (born 25 June 1936) is a German zoologist, sociobiologist and evolutionary biologist who studies evolution and social organization in ants. He is the author of several books, including The Ants, for which he and his co-author, E. O. Wilson, received the Pulitzer Prize for non-fiction writing in 1991.

Biography
Hölldobler was born June 25, 1936, in Erling-Andechs, Bavaria, Germany; he was the son of Karl and Maria Hölldobler. He studied biology and chemistry at the University of Würzburg. His doctoral thesis was on the social behavior of the male carpenter ant and their role in the organization of carpenter ant societies. He was named professor of zoology at the University of Frankfurt in 1971. From 1973 to 1990, he was professor of biology and the Alexander Agassiz Professor of Zoology at Harvard University in Cambridge, Massachusetts. In 1989, he returned to Germany to accept the chair of behavioral physiology and sociobiology  at the Theodor-Boveri-Institute of the University of Würzburg. From 2002 to 2008 Hölldobler was an Andrew D. White Professor at Large at Cornell University in Ithaca, New York. Since his retirement in 2004 Hölldobler has worked as a research professor in the School of Life Sciences at Arizona State University in Tempe, Arizona. There he is one of the founders of the Social Insect Research Group (SIRG) and the Center for Social Dynamics and Complexity.

Research fields and publications
Hölldobler  is one of the world's leading experts in myrmecology. His experimental and theoretical contributions cover sociobiology, behavioral ecology, and chemical ecology. His primary study subjects are social insects and in particular ants. His work has  provided valuable insights into mating strategies, regulation of reproduction, the evolution of social parasitism, chemical communications, and the concept of "superorganisms". Publications on these topics include:

 1965. with U. Maschwitz, Der Hochzeitsschwarm der Rossameise Camponotus herculeanus L. (Hym. Formicidae). Z. Vergl. Physiol. 50:551-568
 1971. Sex pheromone in the ant Xenomyrmex floridanus J. Insect. Physiol. 17:1497-1499
 1973. with M. Wüst Ein Sexualpheromon bei der Pharaoameise Monomorium pharaonis (L.) Z. Tierpsychol. 32:1-9
 1974. Home range orientation and territoriality in harvesting ants Proc. Natl. Acad. Sci. USA, 71:3274-3277
 1976. Recruitment behavior, home range orientation and territoriality in harvester ants, Pogonomyrmex Behav. Ecol. Sociobiol. 1:3-44
 1978. with H. Engel, Tergal and sternal glands in ants Psyche 85:285-330
 1980. with C. Lumsden, Territorial Strategies in Ants Science 210:732-739
 1982. with H. Engel, R.W. Taylor, A New Sternal Gland in Ants and its Function in Chemical Communication Naturwissenschaften 69:90
 1983. with E.O. Wilson, Queen Control in Colonies of Weaver Ants (Hymenoptera: Formicidae) Ann. of the Ent. Soc. of America 76:235-238
 1984. with N.F. Carlin, Nestmate and Kin Recognition in Interspecific Mixed Colonies of Ants Science 222:1027-1029
 1987. with N.F. Carlin, Anonymity and specificity in the chemical communication signals of social insects J. Comp. Physiol. A 161:567-581
 1992. with K. Sommer, Coexistence and dominance among queens and mated workers in the ant Pachycondyla tridentata Naturwissenschaften 19:470-472
 1998. with M. Obermayer, G.D. Alpert, Chemical trail communication in the amblyoponine species Mystrium rogeri Forel (Hymenoptera, Formicidae, Ponerinae) Chemoecology, 8:119-123
 1999 with K. Tsuji, K. Egashira, Regulation of worker reproduction by direct physical contact in the ant Diacamma sp. from Japan Animal Behaviour 58:337-343
 2003. with J. Gadau, C.P. Strehl, J. Oettler, Determinants of intracolonial relatedness in Pogonomyrmex rugosus (Hymenoptera; Formicidae) – mating frequency and brood raids, Molecular Ecology 12: 1931-1938
 1999. with J. Liebig, C. Peeters, Worker policing limits the number of reproductives in a ponerine ant Proc. R. Soc. Lond. B 266:1865-1870

Awards
 John Simon Guggenheim Fellowship (1980)
 Gottfried Wilhelm Leibniz Prize of the Deutschen Forschungsgemeinschaft (1990)
 Pulitzer Prize (1991) for The Ants together with Edward O. Wilson
  U.S. Senior Scientist Prize of the Alexander von Humboldt Foundation
  Werner Heisenberg-Medal of the Alexander von Humboldt Foundation
 Körberpreis for the European Science (1996)
 Karl Ritter von Frisch Medal and Science Prize of the German Zoological Society (1996)
 Benjamin Franklin-Wilhelm v. Humboldt Prize of the German-American Academic Council ( 1999)
 Honorary doctor Biology of the University of Konstanz (2000)
 Order of Merit First Class of the Federal Republic of Germany (2000)
 Bavarian Maximilian Order for Science and Art (2003)
 Alfried-Krupp-Wissenschaftspreis (2004)
 Treviranus-Medal of the Verband deutscher Biologen (vdbiol) (2006)
 Lichtenberg Medal (2010)
 Ernst-Jünger-Prize for Entomology Baden-Württemberg (2010)
 Cothenius-Medal in Gold of the Deutschen Akademie der Naturforscher Leopoldina (2011)
 Exemplar Award by the American Animal Behavior Society (2013)
 Fabricius medal (2019) (German entomological society)

Academic associations
 Fellow of the American Animal Behavior Society (1992)
 Bayerischen Akademie der Wissenschaften (1986 korrespondierend, 1995 ordentlich)
 American Academy of Arts and Sciences
 Deutsche Nationale Akademie der Wissenschaften Leopoldina (1975)
 Fellow of the American Association for the Advancement of Sciences (1979)
 Academia Europaea (1994) 
 Berlin-Brandenburgische Akademie der Wissenschaften (1995)
 National Academy of Sciences (United States) (1998)
 American Philosophical Society (1997)
 Fellow of the Entomological Society of America (2019)

Documentary films
In addition to his published scientific papers and books, Hölldobler's work was the subject of the documentary film Ants - Nature's Secret Power the  winner of the 2005 Jackson Hole Wildlife Film Festivals Special Jury Prize.

Books

 Bert  Hölldobler, E.O. Wilson: The Ants, Harvard University Press, 1990, 
 Bert  Hölldobler, E.O. Wilson: Journey to the Ants: A Story of Scientific Exploration, 1994, 
 Bert  Hölldobler, E.O. Wilson: The Superorganism: The Beauty, Elegance, and Strangeness of Insect Societies, W.W. Norton, 2008. 
 Bert  Hölldobler, E.O. Wilson: The Leafcutter Ants: Civilization by Instinct, W.W. Norton & Company, Inc., 2011, 
 Bert  Hölldobler, Christina L. Kwapich: The Guests of Ants: How Myrmecophiles Interact with Their Hosts, Belknap Press of Harvard University Press, 2022,

Notes

References

External links

 Curriculum vitae
 Faculty website
 Darwin Distinguished Lecture Series
 Jackson Hole Wildlife Film Festival
  The Social Nature of Nature - Ask A Biologist Audio Interview

Web interviews
Hölldobler's 2007 interview on the Ask A Biologist podcast program details his early life growing up in Germany as well as his interest in ants and writing.
 
 
 
 UC Riverside. Leading Entomologist to Give Talk at UC Riverside on Communication and Cooperation in Ant Societies

1936 births
Living people
Gottfried Wilhelm Leibniz Prize winners
German entomologists
Myrmecologists
Pulitzer Prize for General Non-Fiction winners
University of Würzburg alumni
Academic staff of the University of Würzburg
Academic staff of Goethe University Frankfurt
Harvard University faculty
Cornell University faculty
Arizona State University faculty
20th-century German writers
21st-century German writers
21st-century German male writers
Members of the German Academy of Sciences Leopoldina
Members of Academia Europaea
Foreign associates of the National Academy of Sciences
Members of the United States National Academy of Sciences
Fellows of the Entomological Society of America
People from Starnberg (district)
German expatriates in the United States
Chemical ecologists
Entomological writers
Sociobiologists
Members of the American Philosophical Society